Of Mice and Men is a 1939 American drama film based on the 1937 play of the same name, which itself was based on the novella of the same name by author John Steinbeck. The film stars Burgess Meredith, Betty Field, and Lon Chaney Jr., and features Charles Bickford, Roman Bohnen, Bob Steele, and Noah Beery Jr. The film tells the story of two men, George and his intellectually disabled partner Lennie, trying to survive during the dustbowl of the 1930s and pursuing a dream of owning their own ranch instead of always working for others. Starring in the lead roles were relative Hollywood newcomer Burgess Meredith as George and veteran actor Lon Chaney Jr. (the son of famed silent film actor Lon Chaney) as Lennie. Chaney had appeared in more than 50 films by that point in his career, but Of Mice and Men was his first major role. Betty Field's role as Mae was her breakthrough role in film.

The film, produced by the Hal Roach Studios, was adapted by Eugene Solow and directed by Lewis Milestone. It was nominated for four Academy Awards, including Best Picture. The musical score was by American composer Aaron Copland. Released in 1939, it appeared in the 1980s and 1990s in revival theater houses, video and cable, and it earned a following of fans (both audience members and film critics) who praised the movie for its interpretation of the Steinbeck novella.

Plot

Two migrant field workers in California during the Great Depression, George Milton, an intelligent and quick-witted man and Lennie Small, an ironically named man of large stature and immense strength who, due to his mental disability, has a mind of a child, hope to one day attain their shared dream of settling down on their own piece of land. Lennie's part of the dream, which he never tires of hearing George describe, is merely to tend to (and touch) soft rabbits on the farm. They are fleeing from their previous employment in Weed where they were run out of town after Lennie's love of stroking soft things resulted in an accusation of attempted rape when he touched and held onto a young woman's dress.

After being dropped off 10 miles from their destination, George and Lennie decide to camp for the night by the Salinas River where George eases the tensions by telling Lennie his favorite story about their future farm.

The next day, they arrive at the ranch near Soledad. They meet Candy, the aged, one-handed ranch-hand with his old dog he had raised since it was a puppy. After meeting with the ranch boss, Jackson, the pair are confronted by Curley, the small-statured, jealous and violent son of the ranch owner, who threatens to beat Lennie as Curley hates men who are of large stature. To make matters worse, Curley's seductive yet sadistic and conniving wife, Mae, to whom Lennie is instantly attracted, flirts with the other ranch hands. George orders Lennie not to look at or even talk to her, as he senses the troubles that Mae could bring to the men.

One night, Mae enters the barn to talk with Slim. Even when Mae explains how her life has been during the Depression, Slim refuses to listen to her and shuns her, saying "You got no troubles, except what you bring on yourself" and tells her to go back to the house. When this statement causes Mae to sob, Slim gives in and lets her talk. Back at the bunkhouse, Candy offers to join with George and Lennie after Carlson puts down his dog, so they can buy the farm, and the dream appears to move closer to reality. Curley appears and makes a scene in the bunkhouse as the workers mock him after he accused Slim of keeping company with his wife. George and Lennie's dream is overshadowed when Curley catches Lennie laughing, grabs him from his bunk and starts punching him in the face. Lennie asks for help from George, who tells him to fight back. Upon hearing George say this, Lennie catches Curley's hand and crushes it. Slim gives Curley an ultimatum: if Curley tells his father to get Lennie and George fired, Slim will tell everyone what happened. Curley is told to say that he got his hand caught in a piece of machinery.

On Saturday night, everyone except Lennie, Candy and Crooks (because of his race) are in town, enjoying themselves. Crooks asks Lennie to stay in his room and Lennie explains to him about the farm that he, George and Candy are going to own, forgetting his promise to George not to tell this to anyone. Candy gets into the conversation too and, when George comes back first, he sees Lennie smoking a cigar and takes it away, guessing what Lennie had done. At that moment, Mae enters the bunkhouse, trying to ask Crooks who crushed Curley's hand. When Crooks refuses to respond, Mae callously calls the four "bindlestiffs" in an attempt to belittle them. When Candy responds with proof of what they are going to do in the future, Mae refuses to accept their American dream, calling him an "old goat." When Mae tries to get Crooks to explain what happened to Curley's hand (despite the fact that he was not present), George mentions that nobody did it, briefly leading Mae to believe that George was the one who crushed his hand. George tries to explain what they are going to do in the future, and that, if Mae keeps constantly flirting with them, she is going to cause the dream to crash. The callous Mae refuses to listen, and, while looking for the person who crushed her husband's hand, sees Lennie's bloodied and bruised face, and she finds out that he is the one responsible. When Mae tries to be kind to Lennie and to "thank" him for what he did, George grabs her by the shoulder, berates her and tells her to return to the house. Mae refuses to do so, saying that she has the right to talk to and flirt with whomever she comes across. Jackson, who happened to be standing by Crooks' door, catches George with his hand raised, with the intention to slap Mae across the face because of her arrogance and negligence. Holding a horsewhip in his hand, Jackson silently dissuades him from doing so and to let Mae go back to the house unharmed.

The next morning, Mae confronts Curley, who repeats the same statement Slim gave him earlier but. because Mae knows the truth, she taunts him, calling him "a punk with a crippled hand!" Curley then tells her that their marriage is over, and that she is going to be kicked out of the ranch due to her carnal behavior with the ranch hands. She continues to laugh hysterically until she starts to weep, realizing she is now done for. Before she can leave, Mae enters the barn to pet a few of Slim's puppies, when she spots Lennie sobbing, as he killed his puppy by stroking it too hard. When Lennie tries to leave, knowing he should not be talking to Mae as ordered by George, she stops him from leaving and forces him to talk to her. Mae explains to Lennie what she wanted to be before Curley shattered her dream. When Lennie tells Mae that he loves to stroke soft things, Mae allows him to stroke her hair, telling him not to "muss it up." Mae starts to resist and scream when Lennie strokes her hair too hard. However, when Lennie tries to silence Mae, he accidentally kills her by breaking her neck. This puts an end to their own American dream.

When Candy and George find Mae's body, they tell the others, including Curley, who grows infuriated. As a result, a lynch mob gathers to kill Lennie. However, George and Slim go off alone to find Lennie. After he and Candy see Mae's dead body, George shows Slim that he has Carlson's Luger. George and Slim separate and go to find Lennie. George finds him first and, realizing he is doomed to a life of loneliness and despair like the rest of the migrant workers, wants to spare Lennie a painful death at the hands of the furious and cold-hearted Curley. After giving Lennie one last retelling of their dream of buying their own land, George shoots Lennie in the back of the head with Carlson's Luger before the mob can find him. When the mob arrives too late, only Slim realizes what George has done, and he hands the Luger to a local police officer as they leave the river.

Cast

 Burgess Meredith as George
 Betty Field as Mae
 Lon Chaney Jr. as Lennie
 Charles Bickford as Slim
 Roman Bohnen as Candy
 Bob Steele as Curley
 Noah Beery Jr. as Whit
 Oscar O'Shea as Jackson
 Granville Bates as Carlson
 Leigh Whipper as Crooks
 Helen Lynd as Susie

Reception

Critical response
When the film was first released, Frank S. Nugent, the film critic of The New York Times, praised the film and the acting, writing "...New York, unless we have miscalculated again, will endorse its film version, at the Roxy, as heartily as it has endorsed the film of the Joads. The pictures have little in common as narrative, but they have much in common as art; the same deft handling of their material, the same understanding of people, the same ability to focus interest sharply and reward it with honest craftsmanship and skill... No small share of that credit belongs to the men and the one young woman Hal Roach has recruited for his production. Miss Field has added stature to the role of the foreman's wife by relieving her of the play's box-office-conscious order that she behave like a hoyden."

The staff at Variety magazine also reviewed the film favorably, writing "Under skillful directorial guidance of Lewis Milestone, the picture retains all of the forceful and poignant drama of John Steinbeck's original play and novel, in presenting the strange palship and eventual tragedy of the two California ranch itinerants. In transferring the story to the screen, the scripter Eugene Solow eliminated the strong language and forthright profanity. Despite this requirement for the Hays whitewash squad, Solow and Milestone retain all of the virility of the piece in its original form."

The film received positive reviews, earning a 100% score on the review aggregator website Rotten Tomatoes based on 11 reviews.

Accolades
It was nominated for four Academy Awards: Best Picture, Best Sound Recording (Elmer A. Raguse), Best Musical Scoring and Best Original Score.

The film is recognized by American Film Institute in these lists:
 AFI's 100 Years of Film Scores – Nominated

See also
 List of films with a 100% rating on Rotten Tomatoes, a film review aggregator website

References

External links

 
 
 
 
 
 

1939 films
1939 drama films
American drama films
American black-and-white films
Films about intellectual disability
Films based on American novels
Films based on works by John Steinbeck
Films directed by Lewis Milestone
Films set in California
Films set on farms
Films shot in California
Great Depression films
United Artists films
Film 1939
Films scored by Aaron Copland
1930s English-language films
1930s American films
Films about disability